This is a list of yearly Southern Conference football standings.

Southern standings

References

Southern Conference
Standings